"If" is a song written by American singer-songwriter David Gates in 1971. Originally popularized by his group Bread, "If" charted at No. 4 on the U.S. Billboard Hot 100 when released as a single in 1971 and No. 6 in Canada. It also spent three weeks at No. 1 on the U.S. Easy Listening chart, and one week at the top of the Canadian AC chart.

In the U.S., Bread's tune was the shortest song title to become a top ten hit until 1993, when Prince hit No. 7 with "7", and Britney Spears reached No. 1 with "3" in 2009.

Chart performance

Weekly charts

Year-end charts

Cover versions

Telly Savalas recorded a mostly-spoken interpretation which reached No. 1 on the UK Singles Chart for two weeks in March 1975, and has the shortest title of any song to reach No. 1 in the UK. This version also charted at No. 12 on the US Billboard Easy Listening chart in late 1974. In Canada, "If" reached No. 88 in the Pop charts, and No. 40 in the AC charts. The Savalas version peaked at number 12 in Australia and was the 81st biggest selling single in Australia in 1975.

A parody take on Savalas' rendition, by voice over artists Chris Sandford and Bill Mitchell performing as Yin and Yan, reached No. 25 in the UK.

References

1971 singles
1971 songs
Folk rock songs
Elektra Records singles
1975 singles
Bread (band) songs
Songs written by David Gates
UK Singles Chart number-one singles
Irish Singles Chart number-one singles